The 1910–11 season was the 19th in the history of the Western Football League.

The league champions this season were the unbeaten Bristol City Reserves, the first time that the league had been won by a reserve team, although both Bristol City Reserves and Bristol Rovers Reserves had won the old Division Two title on a number of occasions.

Final table
Three new clubs joined the league, but the number of clubs was reduced from 13 to 10 clubs, after Aberdare Town, Kingswood Rovers, Merthyr Town, Radstock Town, Ton Pentre and Treharris all left the league.
Camerton
Clevedon, rejoining the league after leaving in 1895.
Weston-super-Mare, rejoining the league after leaving in 1902.

References

1910-11
1910–11 in Welsh football
1910–11 in English association football leagues